1982 in the Philippines details events of note that happened in the Philippines in the year 1982.

Incumbents

 President: Ferdinand Marcos  (KBL)
 Prime Minister: Cesar Virata  (KBL)
House Speaker: Querube Makalintal
 Chief Justice: Enrique Fernando

Events

March
 March 30 – At least 38 deaths resulted when Typhoon Nelson tears through the central and southern areas of the country.

May
 May 17 – Barangay elections are held for the first time in the country's 42,000 barangays for the positions of barangay captains and six councilors following the Batas Pambansa Blg. 222 or the Barangay Election Act of 1982.

July
 July 21 – Unidentified gunmen ambush a car carrying Minister of State and former Vice President Emmanuel Pelaez in New Manila, Quezon City, seriously injuring him and killing his driver.
 July 25 – The tourist ship 'Coral Island' caught fire off Manila Bay when an engine exploded on a trial run, and 21 crew members died.

November
November 18 - Sara Jane Coronel Areza is proclaimed Top 15 in the Miss World 1982 pageant night which is held in the Royal Albert Hall, London, United Kingdom.

Holidays

As per Act No. 2711 section 29, issued on March 10, 1917, any legal holiday of fixed date falls on Sunday, the next succeeding day shall be observed as legal holiday. Sundays are also considered legal religious holidays. Bonifacio Day was added through Philippine Legislature Act No. 2946. It was signed by then-Governor General Francis Burton Harrison in 1921. On October 28, 1931, the Act No. 3827 was approved declaring the last Sunday of August as National Heroes Day. As per Republic Act No. 3022, April 9th was proclaimed as Bataan Day. Independence Day was changed from July 4 (Philippine Republic Day) to June 12 (Philippine Independence Day) on August 4, 1964.

 January 1 – New Year's Day
 February 22 – Legal Holiday
 April 8 – Maundy Thursday
 April 9:
 Good Friday
 Araw ng Kagitingan (Day of Valor)
 May 1 – Labor Day
 June 12 – Independence Day 
 July 4 – Philippine Republic Day
 August 13  – Legal Holiday
 August 29 – National Heroes Day
 September 21 – Thanksgiving Day
 November 30 – Bonifacio Day
 December 25 – Christmas Day
 December 30 – Rizal Day

Sports
 November 19–December 4 – The Philippines participates in the 1982 Asian Games held in New Delhi, India. It ranked 10th with 2 gold medals, 3 silver medals and 9 bronze medals with a total of 14 over-all medals.

Births
 January 3 – Gabby Espinas, basketball player
 January 13 – Tekla, comedian and host
 January 24 – Enzo Pastor, racing driver (d. 2014)
 February 8 – Champ Lui Pio, Musician, Vocalist
 February 9 – Joe Devance, basketball player
 February 12 – Niño Canaleta, basketball player
 February 15 – James Yap, basketball player
 March 12:
 Samigue Eman, basketball player
 Yexel Sebastian, dancer, internet celebrity, toy collector
 March 16 – Aubrey Miles, host, singer, model, actress
 April 8 – Aaron Aban, basketball player
 May 10 – Miko Sotto, actor (d. 2003)
 May 12 – Donnie Nietes, Filipino boxer
 May 13 – Larry Fonacier, basketball player
 May 16 – Billy Crawford, singer, dancer, songwriter, actor, comedian, and TV host
 May 17 – Kaye Abad, Filipino-American actress
 May 28 – Desiree del Valle, actress
 June 2 – Wendy Valdez, actress
 June 5 – Baron Geisler, actor, amateur artist and poet
 June 10 – Gaby Dela Merced, racecar driver
 June 16 – Jodi Sta. Maria, actress 
 June 27 – Polo Ravales, actor 
 July 14 – Denok Miranda, basketball player
 July 16 – Marco Morales, actor 
 July 20 – Magnum Membrere, former basketball player
 July 23 – Zanjoe Marudo, actor
 August 4 – Wilter Palma, politician
 August 20 – Ronjay Enrile, basketball player
 August 12 – Iza Calzado, actress
 September 1 – Kris Lawrence, singer
 September 8 – John "Papa Jackson" Gemperle, radio DJ
 October 4:
 Grace Lee, host
 Matet de Leon, actress
 October 10 – Erik Santos, singer
 October 19 – Atom Araullo, journalist
 October 26 – Niña Dolino, actress
 November 10 – Rafael Rosell, actor
 November 29 – Paolo Ballesteros, host, model, actor
 November 30 – Bonbon Custodio, basketball player
 December 6:
 Chynna Ortaleza, actress
 Cesar Catili, basketball player
 December 12 – Alex Cabagnot, basketball player

Deaths
 April 17 – Cornelio Balmaceda, former Secretary of Commerce and Industries (b. 1896)
 June 2 – Oscar Castelo, Secretary of National Defense (b. 1903)
 October 7 – Salvador Araneta, lawyer, educator, and businessman (b. 1902)
 December 13 – Mary Cecilia of Jesus, Discalced Carmelite nun and servant of God (b. 1908)

See also
1982 in Philippine television

References